The N-IV is a major highway in Spain. It connects Madrid to Cádiz. It has generally been up-graded or replaced by the Autovía A-4. It passes via Valdepenas, Córdoba, Ecija, Seville and Jerez de la Frontera.

It forms part of European route E-5.

N-IV